In security, piggybacking, similar to tailgating, refers to when a person tags along with another person who is authorized to gain entry into a restricted area, or pass a certain checkpoint. It can be either electronic or physical. The act may be legal or illegal, authorized or unauthorized, depending on the circumstances. However, the term more often has the connotation of being an illegal or unauthorized act.

To describe the act of an unauthorized person who follows someone to a restricted area without the consent of the authorized person, the term tailgating is also used. "Tailgating" implies no consent (similar to a car tailgating another vehicle on a road), while "piggybacking" usually implies consent of the authorized person.

Piggybacking came to the public's attention particularly in 1999, when a series of weaknesses were exposed in airport security. A study showed that the majority of undercover agents attempting to pass through checkpoints, bring banned items on planes, or board planes without tickets,  were successful. Piggybacking was revealed as one of the methods that was used in order to enter off-limits areas.

Methods

Electronic

 A user fails to properly log off their computer, allowing an unauthorized user to "piggyback" on the authorized user's session.

Physical
Piggybackers have various methods of breaching security. These may include:
Surreptitiously following an individual authorized to enter a location, giving the appearance of being legitimately escorted
Joining a large crowd authorized to enter, and pretending to be a member of the crowd that is largely unchecked
Finding an authorized person who either disregards the law or the rules of the facility, or is tricked into believing the piggybacker is authorized, and agreeably allows the piggybacker to tag along
Piggybacking can be regarded as one of the simpler forms of social engineering.

See also
Gate crashing

References

Security breaches
Access control